This is a list of all the current ambassadors to Burkina Faso.

References 

Ambassadors to Burkina Faso
 
Burkina Faso